Farnsfield railway station was a railway station serving the village of Farnsfield, Nottinghamshire, England.

History

The station opened in 1871 when the Midland Railway opened a line from Southwell to Mansfield.

The station closed to passengers on 12 August 1929  when the Mansfield to Southwell section, which passed through a mining area, closed to passengers. The railway replaced it with a road motor omnibus service provided in conjunction with Mansfield and District Tramways Limited connecting with the railway stations between Mansfield and Newark. Freight services continued until 25 June 1964. The station and goods shed remain as private residences.

Stationmasters
Robert Nash until 1883
John William Holden 1883 - 1908
Charles Treharne Holden from 1908 (son of John W. Holden, also formerly station master at Holwell Junction)

References

Disused railway stations in Nottinghamshire
Railway stations in Great Britain opened in 1871
Railway stations in Great Britain closed in 1929
Former Midland Railway stations